Davidson is an unincorporated community in Boone township in Harrison County, Indiana, in the United States.

History
Davidson had a post office between 1839 and 1924. The community was likely named for its first postmaster, David Aistin.

References

Unincorporated communities in Harrison County, Indiana
Unincorporated communities in Indiana